Wilbur Lee "Bill" Brubaker (November 7, 1910 – April 2, 1978) was a professional American baseball player from 1932 to 1943, although he did not play the 1941 or 1942 seasons. Of his ten years of play, Brubaker played nine with the Pittsburgh Pirates, playing third base. His best year was in 1936, when he hit for a .289 batting average and knocked in an impressive 102 RBIs. Brubaker's career fell apart after that, never even getting 50 RBIs again. His last year, in 1943, was with the Boston Braves.

His grandson, Dennis Rasmussen, also played in the major leagues.

References

External links

1910 births
1978 deaths
Baseball players from Cleveland
Pittsburgh Pirates players
Boston Braves players
Major League Baseball third basemen
UCLA Bruins baseball players
Albany Senators players
Beaumont Exporters players
Indianapolis Indians players
Kansas City Blues (baseball) players
New Orleans Pelicans (baseball) players
Syracuse Chiefs players
Toronto Maple Leafs (International League) players
Fairfax High School (Los Angeles) alumni